Kimberly Hébert Gregory (née Hébert; born December 7, 1972) is an American actress. She began her career in theatre before her breakthrough role as Dr. Belinda Brown in the HBO comedy series Vice Principals in 2016.

Life and career
Kimberly Hébert was born on December 7, 1972, in Houston, the youngest of three. She graduated from The High School for the Performing and Visual Arts in her native Houston. She was educated at Mount Holyoke College where she received a BA in Psychology, and at the University of Chicago where she was awarded her Master's degree in Social Work. She also spent a quarter at DePaul University in the school's MFA program. She was married to Chester Gregory with whom she has a son, but the couple since divorced.

She appeared in a number of Chicago Theatre Company productions as of late 1990s. She received a Joseph Jefferson Award nomination for performance in Shakin' the Mess Outta Misery. In 2012, Hébert Gregory was nominated for Drama Desk Award for Outstanding Featured Actress in a Play for performance in By The Way, Meet Vera Stark.

Hébert Gregory appeared in films I Think I Love My Wife (2007), Red Hook Summer (2012), White Alligator (2012), and The Genesis of Lincoln (2014). She guest-starred on Gossip Girl, Law & Order, Grey's Anatomy, Private Practice, Two and a Half Men, and The Big Bang Theory. In 2014 she had a recurring role as Lucinda Miller in the Lifetime comedy-drama series, Devious Maids. In 2016, she starred as series regular Dr. Belinda Brown in the HBO comedy series Vice Principals opposite Danny McBride. In September 2016, trade publication The Wrap described Hébert Gregory as the show's "breakout star".

In early 2017, she was cast opposite Toni Collette in the ABC action comedy-drama pilot Unit Zero produced by Kenya Barris. The pilot was not picked up to series. She had recurring roles in Brooklyn Nine-Nine and Better Call Saul. Later in 2017, Hébert Gregory was cast in a female leading role in the ABC comedy-drama Kevin (Probably) Saves the World. The series was canceled after one season. She later has appeared on The Act, The Chi and All Rise. In 2019, she co-starred in the romantic drama film Five Feet Apart.

In 2020, Hébert Gregory was cast as Ruth Jean Baskerville Bowen in the National Geographic anthology series Genius: Aretha starring Cynthia Erivo.

Filmography

Film/Movie

Television

References

External links
 

American film actresses
American television actresses
African-American actresses
Living people
Actresses from Houston
20th-century American actresses
21st-century American actresses
American stage actresses
1973 births
Mount Holyoke College alumni